Guanaja Airport  is an airport serving Guanaja, an island of the Bay Islands Department in Honduras.

Facilities

Airlines and destinations

See also
 Transport in Honduras
 List of airports in Honduras

References

External links
 OpenStreetMap - Guanaja
 OurAirports - Guanaja Airport
 
 Google Maps - Guanaja

Airports in Honduras
Bay Islands Department